Joseph Sikora (born June 27, 1976) is an American actor best known for his starring role as Tommy Egan on the Starz series Power and its subsequent spin-offs and sequels, Power Book II: Ghost and Power Book IV: Force, in which he is the main protagonist.

Early life
Sikora was born in Chicago, Illinois, to mother Barbara and father Albin, one of three boys, and lived in the Jefferson Park and Norwood Park neighborhoods. He is of Polish and Dutch descent. Sikora graduated from Notre Dame College Prep in 1994. He studied acting at Columbia College Chicago, where he earned his MA in theater.

Career
As a teenager, Sikora appeared in a McDonald's commercial with Michael Jordan in 1990. He made his Broadway debut in 2006 after he was cast as one of the leads on The Caine Mutiny Court-Martial. He is also an ensemble member of Chicago's Shattered Globe Theatre Company.

Sikora made his acting debut in an episode of The New Adam-12 after playing extras on a few TV shows. He was cast as Johnny in Rudy. After making small appearances in TV shows and films such as Early Edition, Turks, The Watcher, and Ghost World, he was cast in two episodes of Third Watch.
 
In 2003, Sikora was cast as Roger in the direct-to-video biographical-drama film Gacy. After making a few appearances on low-budget movies, he was cast in the Golden Globe-nominated Normal, which he feels was his "break-through" moment when the star of the movie, Tom Wilkinson, told him that "all you have to do is think the line and the camera will read it".

He also took part in plays and was part of the Geffen Theatre's production of Fat Pig and the Los Angeles Theatre's production of Killer Joe. He made many TV appearances between 2005 and 2012, appearing in major network shows including ER, Grey's Anatomy, Criminal Minds, Without a Trace, CSI: Miami, Prison Break, White Collar, Lost, and Dollhouse. He was later cast in the 2007 horror film Night Skies.

He was later cast in two episodes of Law & Order: Special Victims Unit in 2010. That same year, he also portrayed Hans Schroeder in the HBO series Boardwalk Empire as well as an orderly at the mental hospital in Shutter Island. In 2011, he was cast in the television pilot for Body of Proof, as well as being signed in a full role in Adult Swim's comedy horror TV series The Heart, She Holler, playing Sheriff. In early 2012, he signed on to appear in Safe as the son of the head of the Russian mafia. He returned to theater in September 2012 with The Freedom of the City.

In 2012, he appeared in Jack Reacher, in which he played a sniper wrongfully accused of gunning down random people in Pittsburgh, and who requests Jack Reacher's assistance to prove his innocence.

In October 2013, he was cast in the Starz original drama series Power.

In 2020, Sikora portrayed Frank Cosgrove Jr. on the third season of the Netflix crime drama Ozark which was released on March 27, 2020. In 2021, he and his Black Fox Productions company signed a first look deal with Lionsgate TV.

Filmography

Films

Television

Music videos

References

External links
 
 

1976 births
Living people
American male television actors
American male film actors
American people of Polish descent
Columbia College Chicago alumni
20th-century American male actors
21st-century American male actors
Male actors from Chicago
American people of Dutch descent